The 2001–02 Vyshcha Liha season was the 11th since its establishment. FC Dynamo Kyiv were the defending champions.

Teams

Promotions
Zakarpattia Uzhhorod, the runners-up of the 2000–01 Ukrainian First League  – (debut)
Polihraftekhnika Oleksandriya, the third placed of the 2000–01 Ukrainian First League  – (debut)

Note: the 2000–01 Ukrainian First League was won by the second team of Dynamo Kyiv, FC Dynamo-2 Kyiv, which could not be promoted.

Renamed
 FC CSKA Kyiv owned by the Ministry of Defense of Ukraine was sold to the Kyiv city authorities headed by Oleksandr Omelchenko. The club was reorganized and renamed as FC Arsenal Kyiv to commemorate SC Arsenal that existed before 1960s.

Location

Managers

League table

European qualifications case
Due to the fact that both finalists of the 2002 Ukrainian Cup Final Dynamo and Shakhtar qualified for the UEFA Champions League, the fourth European competition berth was to be awarded to the best fourth placed team in the league competition. The fourth place with 40 points earned was Metalist Kharkiv, however there were two more teams with the same number of points Metalurh Zaporizhia and Dnipro Dnipropetrovsk. According to the 2001-02 season regulations the first tie breaker in case of even points were the head-to-head points among the teams that tied. Therefore originally Metalist Kharkiv was the main contender to qualify for the European competitions. However, the administration of FC Metalurh Zaporizhia argued the fact that their team head better head-to-head record with both Metalist Kharkiv (2 1-0-1 2-2 with an away goal) and Dnipro Dnipropetrovsk (2 1-1-0 2-1). On 16 June 2002 the FFU Executive Committee came up with its final decision awarding Metalurh Zaporizhia with qualification to European competitions.

Results

Relegation playoff

Top goalscorers

See also
 2001–02 Ukrainian First League
 2001–02 Ukrainian Second League
 2001–02 Ukrainian Cup

References

External links
ukrsoccerhistory.com - source of information
Decision of the Executive Committee of Football Federation of Ukraine 
Official press release of the Football Federation of Ukraine 

Ukrainian Premier League seasons
1
Ukra